Paulhac may refer to several places in France:

Paulhac, Cantal, in the Cantal department
Paulhac, Haute-Garonne, in the Haute-Garonne department
Paulhac, Haute-Loire, in the Haute-Loire department